Dino Joseph Gaudio (born March 30, 1957) is an American former men’s college basketball coach and broadcaster who was most recently an assistant coach at the University of Louisville in Louisville, Kentucky.  

Gaudio was a longtime assistant under Skip Prosser, serving under him beginning at Wheeling Central Catholic High School in West Virginia and eventually following him to Xavier University in Cincinnati, Ohio and later to Wake Forest University in Winston-Salem, North Carolina; after Prosser’s death in 2007, Gaudio was hired to succeed him and remained there as head coach until 2010.

In addition to his time at Wake Forest, Gaudio also served as head coach of the boys’ basketball team Wheeling Central Catholic High School (succeeding Prosser), as well as the men’s teams at the United States Military Academy in West Point, New York and Loyola University in Baltimore, Maryland (where he again succeeded Prosser).

Biography

Education
Gaudio is a graduate of Ohio University (1981) and Xavier University (master's in secondary education, 1991).

Wake Forest
Gaudio remained loyal to Prosser, his mentor and predecessor at Wake Forest. In the final days of his life, Prosser attended the games of three 5-star recruits in Las Vegas and Orlando. These recruits remained committed to Wake Forest and made up an eventual number-three-ranked recruiting class for the 2008–09 season, signed by Gaudio as a memory to Prosser.

Gaudio tallied three winning seasons at Wake Forest, making the NCAA Tournament in two out of three years. In 2008–09, his Deacons raced out to a 16–0 start and rose to the number-one spot in the rankings for only the second time in school history. However, they went out with a thud, losing in the first round of the ACC Tournament to Maryland before getting blown out by 13-seed Cleveland State in the second round of the NCAA Tournament. A year later, they made another early exit in the ACC Tournament. While they won their first-round NCAA Tournament game, they were drilled by Kentucky in the second round. Gaudio was fired a few weeks later.

Broadcasting
Gaudio became an announcer for ESPN's college basketball coverage in 2011.

Louisville
After seven years with ESPN and out of coaching, Gaudio was hired by Chris Mack to be an assistant for the Louisville Cardinals men's basketball team. Mack and Gaudio were previously assistants together at Wake Forest from 2001–04, before Mack left to become an assistant and later head coach at Xavier University.

On March 18, 2021, Gaudio's contract was not renewed after Mack hinted at a staff shake-up during his season-ending press conference.  Gaudio was then charged with one federal count of attempting to extort money and other things of value from the University of Louisville, according to information released by Michael Bennett, the acting U.S. Attorney for the Western District of Kentucky.  According to the charge, Gaudio, during an in-person meeting with Louisville officials on March 17, 2021, "threatened to report to the media allegations that the University of Louisville men's basketball program had violated [NCAA] rules in its production of recruiting videos for prospective student-athletes and its use of graduate assistants in practice, unless the University of Louisville paid [Gaudio] his salary for an additional 17 months or provided the lump sum equivalent of 17 months of salary."  Louisville officials said in a statement:  "As detailed in the charging document, after Gaudio was informed that his contract would not be renewed, he threatened to inform members of the media of alleged NCAA violations within the men's basketball program unless he was paid a significant sum of money. The allegations of violations are the impermissible production of recruiting videos for prospective student-athletes and the impermissible use of graduate managers in practices and workouts. While the University cannot comment further due to the ongoing federal investigation and the NCAA process, it continues to cooperate with authorities as well as with the NCAA on the matter." On August 22, 2021 he was sentenced to one year of probation and a $10,000 fine.

Head coaching record

College

References

1957 births
Living people
Army Black Knights men's basketball coaches
Basketball coaches from Ohio
College basketball announcers in the United States
College men's basketball head coaches in the United States
Louisville Cardinals men's basketball coaches
American people of Italian descent
Loyola Greyhounds men's basketball coaches
Ohio University alumni
People from Martins Ferry, Ohio
Xavier Musketeers men's basketball coaches
Wake Forest Demon Deacons men's basketball coaches